Rustayi-ye Chahardeh Masum (also Romanized as Rūstāyī-ye Chahārdeh Maʿṣūm; also known as Allahābād (Persian: الله اباد) and Chahārdahmaʿṣūm) is a village in Ekhtiarabad Rural District, in the Central District of Kerman County, Kerman Province, Iran. At the 2006 census, its population was 428, in 107 families.

References 

Populated places in Kerman County